Martín Duffó (born 2 January 1963) is a Peruvian footballer. He played in three matches for the Peru national football team from 1987 to 1993. He was also part of Peru's squad for the 1987 Copa América tournament.

References

External links
 

1963 births
Living people
Peruvian footballers
Peru international footballers
Association football defenders
People from Lima Region